Aribert Wäscher (1 December 1895 – 14 December 1961) was a German film actor.

Selected filmography
 The Black Tulip Festival (1920)
 The Graveyard of the Living (1921)
 Slums of Berlin (1925)
 The Hanseatics (1925)
 The Woman's Crusade (1926)
 People to Each Other (1926)
 Princess Olala (1928)
 The Abduction of the Sabine Women (1928)
 The Lady and the Chauffeur (1928)
 Katharina Knie (1929)
 The Flute Concert of Sanssouci (1930)
 Different Morals (1931)
 Under False Flag (1932)
 A City Upside Down (1933)
 Viktor und Viktoria (1933)
 Love, Death and the Devil (1934)
 The Island (1934)
 Paganini (1934)
 Playing with Fire (1934)
 Lady Windermere's Fan (1935)
 Fresh Wind from Canada (1935)
 Stradivari (1935)
 The Higher Command (1935)
 The Private Life of Louis XIV (1935)
 City of Anatol (1936)
 Under Blazing Heavens (1936)
 Stronger Than Regulations (1936)
 Thunder, Lightning and Sunshine (1936)
 Savoy Hotel 217 (1936)
 Donogoo Tonka (1936)
 My Son the Minister (1937)
 Diamonds (1937)
 Madame Bovary (1937)
 Capriccio (1938)
 The Great and the Little Love (1938)
 The Life and Loves of Tschaikovsky (1939)
 Alarm at Station III (1939)
 The Green Emperor (1939)
 Falstaff in Vienna (1940)
 Women Are Better Diplomats (1941)
 The Swedish Nightingale (1941)
 Rembrandt (1942)
 Love Me (1942)
 Attack on Baku (1942)
 Tell the Truth (1946)
 King of Hearts (1947)
 The Adventures of Fridolin (1948)
 Thank You, I'm Fine (1948)
 Nights on the Nile (1949)
 The Cuckoos (1949)
 Not Without Gisela (1951)
 Stips (1951)
 When the Evening Bells Ring (1951)
 The Man Between (1953)
 The Big Star Parade (1954)

References

External links
 

1895 births
1961 deaths
German male film actors
German male silent film actors
People from Flensburg
Officers Crosses of the Order of Merit of the Federal Republic of Germany
20th-century German male actors